Ardisia opaca is a species of plant in the family Primulaceae. It is found in Colombia, Costa Rica, and Panama. It is threatened by habitat loss.

References

opaca
Flora of Colombia
Flora of Costa Rica
Flora of Panama
Near threatened flora of South America
Taxonomy articles created by Polbot